This is a partial list of people who lived during the Joseon Dynasty of Korea, 1392–1910.

Rulers
See:  List of Korean monarchs

Royals
Grand Prince Yangnyeong
Queen Munjeong
Queen Inhyeon
Prince Sado
Queen Jeongsun
Heungseon Daewongun
Lady Hyegyeong
Empress Myeongseong
Empress Sunjeong

Scholar-officials
Scholar-officials, or munsin, held much of the power in the Joseon Dynasty bureaucracy.  Many members of the intellectual elite, also remembered for their work as poets or philosophers, served as scholar-officials.  Such service, however, was restricted to members of the hereditary yangban class.

Jeong Dojeon
Ha Ryun
Kwon Geun
Jeong Inji
Hwang Hui
Hwangbo In
Kim Jong-seo
Yu Eung-bu
Yu Seong-won
Pak Paeng-nyeon
Seong Sammun
Ha Wi-ji
Yi Gae
Kim Jil
Shin Suk-ju
Han Myung-hoi
Choi Se-jin
Kim Jong-jik
Yi Eon-jeok
Jo Gwang-jo
Yun Im
Yun Won-hyeong
Yi Hwang
Jo Sik
Seong Hon

Ryu Seong-ryong
Yi San-hae
Yi I
Kim Jang-saeng
Kim Jip
Jeong Cheol
Jo Heon
Kim Yuk
Yi Su-gwang
Song Si-yeol
Chae Je-gong
Shin Gwang-su
Yu Hyeong-won
Yi Ik
Yun Hyu
Bak Jiwon
Song Jun-gil
Hong Dae-yong
Yu Deuk-gong
Jeong Yak-yong
Pak Je-ga
Kim Jeong-hui
Pak Gyu-su
Pak Yeong-hyo
Kim Okgyun
Yi Yu-won

Military officials
Military service was technically open to people outside the yangban class, but in practice most high posts were held by the aristocracy.

Yi Il
Shin Rip
Yi Sun-sin
Kwon Yul
Kim Si-min
Yi Eok-gi
Won Gyun
Gang Hong-rip
Shin Ryu

Others
The common classes of Joseon included the yangmin free farmers, the jungin technical class, and the cheonmin underclass. These constituted the bulk of Joseon society, but only a handful of them are known to us today.

Women
Prominent women of the Joseon period were usually either of the high aristocratic class or kisaeng female entertainers.

Hwang Jin-i
Non Gae
Jang Geum, royal physician
Yi Mae-chang
Seo Yeongsuhap, poet and mathematician

Popular leaders
Choe Je-u
Hong Gyeong-nae
Jeon sang ki

Painters
Danwon
Gyeomjae
Hyewon
Owon

Authors
Many of the best-known writers of the Joseon period were also scholar-officials; they are listed above.

Kim Jeong-ho

Inventors
Some scholar-officials, such as Jeong Yak-yong, also worked as inventors. 

Jang Yeong-sil

See also
List of Koreans
List of Silla people
List of Goryeo people
History of Korea

Joseon Dynasty people

Joseon